Jehangira Road (Also spelled Jahangira Road) is a town in Nowshera District of Khyber Pakhtunkhwa province in Pakistan. It is located on the bank of River Kabul at 33°57 North 72°11 East. 

Populated places in Nowshera District